is the name of numerous Buddhist temples in Japan. 
Below is an incomplete list:

Chōju-ji (Kamakura) (official name: Hōkizan Chōju-ji), Kamakura, Kanagawa Prefecture
Chōju-ji (Konan), Konan, Shiga Prefecture, whose Main Hall is a National Treasure of Japan